"Until the Time Is Through" is the sixth single from English boy band Five from their debut studio album, Five (1998). Written by Max Martin and Andreas Carlsson, the ballad was released on 16 November 1998, reaching number two in the United Kingdom and Spain, number three in Ireland, and number eight in Australia. It features Ritchie Neville and Scott Robinson on lead vocals.

Music video

The official music video, filmed at Mentmore Towers, was directed by Max and Dania. It was made for the radio edit version of the song.

Track listings

UK and Irish CD1
 "Until the Time Is Through" (radio edit)
 "Five Megamix"
 Exclusive interview (part 1)

UK and Irish CD2
 "Until the Time Is Through" (radio edit)
 "Stop Pushing Me"
 Exclusive interview (part 2)

UK cassette single
 "Until the Time Is Through" (radio edit)
 "Five Megamix"
 Exclusive Christmas message

European CD single
 "Until the Time Is Through" (radio edit)
 "Five Megamix"

Australian CD single
 "Until the Time Is Through" (radio edit)
 "Stop Pushing Me"
 "Five Megamix"
 Exclusive interview

Credits and personnel
Credits are lifted from the Five album booklet.

Studio
 Recorded at Cheiron Studios (Stockholm, Sweden)

Personnel
 Max Martin – writing, production
 Andreas Carlsson – writing

Charts

Weekly charts

Year-end charts

Certifications and sales

References

1990s ballads
1997 songs
1998 singles
Bertelsmann Music Group singles
Five (band) songs
RCA Records singles
Song recordings produced by Max Martin
Songs written by Andreas Carlsson
Songs written by Max Martin